Jaya Mayu (Quechua jaya pungency, locoto, mayu river) is a Bolivian river in the Cochabamba Department, Esteban Arce Province, Anzaldo Municipality. Jaya Mayu is a left tributary of Caine River.

References

Rivers of Cochabamba Department